Lemohang Jeremiah Mosese (born 17 Jan 1980) is a Mosotho screenwriter, film director and visual artist. He lives in Berlin.

Life

Lemohang Jeremiah Mosese was born and grew up in Hlotse. As a child, Mosese watched 16mm B grade movies in a small abandoned community hall in his home town Hlotse. Before making films he started writing poetry. 

His films explore spiritual and political themes, and are noted for their minimal dialogue, strong poetic imagery, and preoccupation with his own childhood memories, identity and physical and metaphorical death. 

He and a friend founded a production company, Vision 12, but struggled to make it financially viable. After returning to Lesotho, he made his first feature film Khapha tsa Mali (Tears of Blood) (2007). Which he later disowned as "Bad cinema". His follow-up work was a short film trilogy consisting of Mosonngoa (2014), Behemoth or the Game of God (2016), and video installation / short film Loss of Innocence (2008). His short films have travelled extensively, winning awards on the festival circuit.  

In 2019 Mosese receive critical acclaim on the film festival circuit with his feature-length essay film Mother, I Am Suffocating. This is My Last Film About You is a docufiction essay treating the filmmaker's personal exile from Lesotho. It went on to premiere at the Berlin International Film Festival in 2019 and continues to screen at festivals and museums, including MoMA and Museum Ludwig.

In This Is Not a Burial, It's a Resurrection, a widow mourning the death of her son leads resistance to a dam that would destroy the village cemetery. It was developed through the Biennale College. It was screened in 76th Venice International Film Festival, Rotterdam Film Festival 2020, Sundance Film Festival 2020 and many others. Mosese was the recipient of several awards for the film, including Special Jury Award for Visionary Filmmaking at the Sundance Film Festival.

Films
 Tears of Blood, 2007.
 Loss of Innocence, 2008. Short film / Video installation 
 Mosonngoa, The Mocked One, 2014 Short film
 Behemoth: Or the Game of God, 2016. Short film
 Mother, I Am Suffocating. This Is My Last Film About You, 2019
 This Is Not a Burial, It's a Resurrection, 2019

References

External links
 

1980 births
Living people
Lesotho film directors
Sundance Film Festival award winners